A Document of Dissent: 1993–2013 is a compilation album by the punk band Anti-Flag. The album was released on July 21, 2014, on Fat Wreck Chords. It marked the band's first release on the label since The Terror State, in 2003.

The album contains 26 tracks recorded and released by the band between 1996 and 2012, each newly remastered by Mass Giorgini.

Track listing

Personnel 
Anti-Flag
 Justin Sane – guitar, vocals
 Pat Thetic – drums
 Chris Head – guitar, vocals (tracks 3–26)
 Chris #2 – bass, vocals (tracks 3–26)
 Andy Flag – bass, vocals (tracks 1–2)

References

Anti-Flag albums
2014 albums
Fat Wreck Chords albums